Jonathan Craig MLA is a former Democratic Unionist Party (DUP) politician in Northern Ireland, who was a Member of the Legislative Assembly (MLA) for Lagan Valley from 2007 until his defeat at the 2016 Assembly election.

Craig was educated at Dromore High School, Friends School and is a graduate of the University of Ulster. He was first elected to Lisburn City Council in 2001 and served as Mayor of Lisburn in 2006–07. As at August 2015, he is a Political Member of the Northern Ireland Policing Board.

References

External links
 Jonathan Craig MLA, LaganValleyDUP.co.uk  
 Profile, DUP.org.uk

1965 births
Living people
Alumni of Ulster University
Democratic Unionist Party MLAs
Members of Lisburn City Council
Mayors of places in Northern Ireland
Northern Ireland MLAs 2007–2011
Northern Ireland MLAs 2011–2016